Francisco José Rodríguez Gaitán (born 22 May 1995), commonly known as Fran, is a Spanish footballer who plays as a right back for CD Calahorra.

Club career
Born in Almuñécar, Granada, Andalusia, Fran joined Real Madrid's youth setup in 2008, aged 13, after spells at AD Almuñécar 77 and Motril CF. He was promoted to the former's C-team in 2014, but made his senior debut with the reserves in a 1–2 away loss against Atlético Madrid B on 24 August.

Fran scored his first senior goal on 12 October 2014, netting the game's only in an away success of the C-side over Internacional de Madrid CF. He was definitely promoted to the B-team ahead of the 2015–16 campaign, and established himself as a regular starter for the side.

On 11 July 2016 Fran signed a three-year contract with Segunda División side Real Zaragoza, as a free agent. He made his professional debut on 27 August, coming on as a second-half substitute for goalscorer Manuel Lanzarote in a 3–3 away draw against CD Lugo.

On 12 July 2017, Fran moved to fellow second division team UD Almería on a two-year deal. In the following March, he suffered a knee injury which took him out of the entire 2018–19 campaign.

Fran subsequently resumed his career in the third division, representing CF Rayo Majadahonda and CD Calahorra.

Personal life
Fran's older brother Andy is also a footballer. A midfielder, he too was groomed at Real Madrid.

References

External links
Real Madrid profile

1995 births
Living people
Footballers from Almuñécar
Spanish footballers
Association football defenders
Segunda División players
Segunda División B players
Primera Federación players
Tercera División players
Real Madrid C footballers
Real Madrid Castilla footballers
Real Zaragoza players
UD Almería players
CF Rayo Majadahonda players
CD Calahorra players
Spain youth international footballers